The Orthodox Church of Ukraine (OCU) is an autocephalous Eastern Orthodox church whose canonical territory is Ukraine.

The church was united at the unification council in Kyiv on 15 December 2018 as a condition for recognition of it and was granted the tomos of autocephaly (decree of ecclesial independence) by the Ecumenical Patriarchate of Constantinople in Istanbul on 5 January 2019. The unification council voted to unite all the existing Ukrainian Orthodox major jurisdictions: the Ukrainian Orthodox Church – Kyiv Patriarchate (UOC-KP) and the Ukrainian Autocephalous Orthodox Church (UAOC) as well as a part of the Ukrainian Orthodox Church of the Moscow Patriarchate (a branch of the Moscow-based Russian Orthodox Church, which claims jurisdiction over Ukraine). The Unification Council elected Epiphanius Dumenko – previously the Metropolitan of Pereiaslav-Khmelnytskyi and Bila Tserkva (UOC-KP) – as its primate, the Metropolitan of Kyiv and all Ukraine.

According to the statute that the OCU adopted at the unification council, "Orthodox Christians of Ukrainian provenance in the Orthodox diaspora" should henceforth be subject to the jurisdiction of the diocesan bishops of the Ecumenical Patriarchate (Article 4 of the Statute). This provision is also enshrined in the OCU's tomos of autocephaly. In March 2019 Metropolitan Epiphanius said that the transfer of parishes of the dissolved Kyiv Patriarchate to the jurisdiction of the Ecumenical Patriarchate had already begun. The creation and subsequent recognition of the OCU by other autocephalous Orthodox Churches have met staunch opposition and attempts at subversion on the part of the Russian Orthodox Church (Moscow Patriarchate) as well as the government of Russia.

Name 
The official name of the church is the "Orthodox Church of Ukraine" (the use of the name "Ukrainian Orthodox Church" is also allowed). The style of its primate is "His Beatitude (name), Metropolitan of Kyiv and All Ukraine". The Tomos of autocephaly of the OCU refers to the OCU as the "Most Holy Church of Ukraine".

On 30 January 2019, the OCU was legally registered under the name "Kyїvan Metropolitanate of the Ukrainian Orthodox Church (Orthodox Church of Ukraine)". The head of the Ukrainian Department of Religious Affairs of the Ministry of Culture, Andriy Yurash, clarified: "These two terms [the UOC and the OCU] will be used as synonymous and this is expressly agreed with the Phanar. Therefore, the use of the terms, the Ukrainian Orthodox Church and the Orthodox Church of Ukraine, is affixed precisely to the administrative unit that is called the Kyivan Metropolitanate".

In his annual report at the hierarchal assembly on 15 December 2020, Metropolitan Epiphanius I clarified that names of the following churches – "Ukrainian Autocephalous Orthodox Church", "Ukrainian Orthodox Church – Kyiv Patriarchate" and "Kyiv Patriarchate" – are all additional historical names for the same Orthodox Church of Ukraine.

History

Metropolitanate of Kyiv 

In 988, as a result of the christianization of Kyivan Rus by Volodymyr I, the first Christian church on the Ukrainian territory was formed under the name of the Metropolitanate of Kyiv of the Ecumenical Patriarchate of Constantinople, with its center in the city of Kyiv. In 1448, the Council of Moscow's Bishops, without the consent of the Ecumenical Patriarch in Constantinople, appointed Jonah, Bishop of Riazan, Metropolitan of Kyiv. This event is considered the beginning of the separation of the Church of Muscovy. After the Union of Brest in 1596, there was a split in Ukrainian Christianity, which has divided into Orthodox and Greek Catholics.

Annexation of the Metropolitanate of Kyiv by the Moscow Patriarchate 

In 1685, the Moscow Patriarchate began the annexation of the Metropolitanate of Kyiv of the Ecumenical Patriarchate, ordaining Metropolitan Gedeon of Kyiv in Muscovy. In 1686, through simony, Ecumenical Patriarch Dionysius IV (who was later anathema) issued a Synodal letter granting the right to ordinate the Metropolitan of Kyiv to the Moscow Patriarch in the manner of austerity elected by the council of clergy and the faithful of his diocese. It was obligatory that the Metropolitan of Kyiv should mention the Ecumenical Patriarch of Constantinople as his First Hierarch in any service, proclaiming and confirming his canonical dependence on the Mother Church of Constantinople, but none of these conditions were met. The Metropolitanate of Kyiv actually became one of the ordinary dioceses of the Moscow Patriarchate, when Peter the Great in 1722 appointed Barlaam (Voniatovych) to the rank of archbishop, not metropolitan. The Holy Synod of the Ecumenical Patriarchate in the process of granting autocephaly to the Church of Ukraine during its meeting on 11 October 2018 canceled the Synodal Letter of 1686 due to simony and its gross violation of the rights of an independent metropolitanate.

Attempts to restore the Orthodox Church of Ukraine in the jurisdiction of Constantinople 

The Ukrainian Hetman Ivan Mazepa, seeking for the independence of the Cossack Hetmanate, was among the first to return to the omophorion of the Ecumenical Patriarchate. A multitude of churches were built all over Ukraine during his reign in the Ukrainian Baroque style. Despite the anathema, laid on Mazepa by the Russian Church in 1708, it was not recognized by the Ecumenical Patriarchate, which considers it uncanonical and imposed with political motives as a means of political and ideological repression, with no religious, theological or canonical reasons.

The Constitution of Pylyp Orlyk, written in 1710, which is also considered to be the one of the first examples of constitutional documents in the world, proclaimed the Eastern Orthodox faith to be the faith of Ukraine, with the Metropolitanate of Kyiv acquiring the direct subordination to the Apostolic Church of Constantinople. Due to the Battle of Poltava, when Charles XII of Sweden's and Hetman Mazepa's armies were defeated by Peter I of Russia, the constitution never came into power.

Proclaiming of the Ukrainian Autocephalous Orthodox Church 

In the wake of the breakup of the Russian Empire, the Ukrainian Orthodox Christians again sought autonomy or autocephaly from Moscow. The independent, autocephalous Ukrainian Orthodox Church was proclaimed by the Directorate of Ukraine led by Symon Petliura in 1919.

The Law on the Supreme Government of the Ukrainian Autocephalous Orthodox Church stipulated that the Supreme Church Authority in Ukraine would lose all dependence on the Russian Patriarch and move to the All-Ukrainian Church Council.

In 1921 an All-Ukrainian Sobor was called in Kyiv, and the Ukrainian Autocephalous Orthodox Church was declared independent from the Moscow Patriarchate. The Sobor delegates chose Metropolitan Vasyl Lypkivsky as head of the church. In this form, the Ukrainian Autocephalous Orthodox Church existed until 1936 when, due to Soviet pressure, it was liquidated, with some of its members emigrating to the United States.

For a short period of time, the UAOC was restored during occupation of Ukraine by Nazi Germany in 1942. This period lasted till the return of the Red Army in 1944, after that the UAOC was again liquidated for a second time and remained structured only in the Ukrainian diaspora.

In 1990, the Ukrainian Autocephalous Orthodox Church was reinstated in Ukraine, and the former Ukrainian Orthodox Church of Canada metropolitan Mstyslav (Skrypnyk) was enthroned as a patriarch. Since 2000, the church primate has been the Metropolitan of Kyiv and All Ukraine.

Unification Сouncil 

Following months of negotiations and preparations, on 15 December 2018, all the bishops of the UOC-KP and the UAOC as well as two metropolitans of the UOC-MP convened in Kyiv's Saint Sophia Cathedral, presided over by the metropolitan of the ecumenical throne, to merge into the Orthodox Church of Ukraine, elect their primate and adopt the statute of the newly independent Church of Ukraine.

Metropolitan Epiphanius of the UOC-KP, who had been chosen on 13 December by the UOC-KP as its only candidate, and was believed to have been Filaret Denysenko's right arm and protégé, was elected Metropolitan of Kyiv and all Ukraine by the unification council by the second round of voting.

Epiphanius later made clear that no important decision would be taken by his church until he had received the church's formal ecclesiastical decree (or "tomos").

The Ecumenical Patriarch congratulated and blessed the newly elected metropolitan on the day of his election and said the newly elected primate was invited to come to Istanbul to concelebrate the Divine Liturgy with the Ecumenical Patriarch and receive the Orthodox Church of Ukraine's tomos on 6 January 2019.

Shortly after the Council, Metropolitan Epiphanius said that the OCU had about 7 thousand parishes.

Advertisements to promote a united Ukrainian Orthodox Church had been made months prior to the Unification Council. Petro Poroshenko declared "not a dime" from the Ukrainian State had been paid for them, that he paid those advertisements with his own money. Poroshenko refused to state how much had been spent.

Following the Council, Filaret Denysenko, who had been the primate and Patriarch of the Ukrainian Orthodox Church – Kyiv Patriarchate (1995–2018), became the "honorary patriarch" of the Orthodox Church of Ukraine, serving in the St Volodymyr's Cathedral.

Granting of the Tomos of autocephaly 

On 5 January 2019, Bartholomew I of Constantinople and Metropolitan Epiphanius celebrated a Divine Liturgy in St. George's Cathedral in Istanbul. The Tomos was signed thereafter, also in St. George's Cathedral. The Tomos "had come into force from the moment of its signing." The signing of the tomos officially established the autocephalous Orthodox Church of Ukraine.

After the Tomos was signed, Patriarch Batholomew delivered a speech addressing Metropolitan Epiphanius. President Poroshenko and Metropolitan Epiphanius also delivered speeches, Epiphanius addressing Poroshenko by saying this: "Your name, Mr President, will remain forever in the history of the Ukrainian people and the church next to the names of our princes Volodymyr the Great, Yaroslav the Wise, Kostiantyn Ostrozky and Hetman Ivan Mazepa".

On 6 January 2019, after a Divine Liturgy concelebrated by Metropolitan Epiphanius and Patriarch Bartholomew, the latter read out the Tomos of the OCU and then handed it to Metropolitan Epiphanius. President Poroshenko was present during the signing and handing over of the Tomos.

On 7 January 2019, Metropolitan Epiphanius celebrated the Divine Liturgy in Saint Sophia's Cathedral, where the Tomos of autocephaly was exposed during the liturgy. The Tomos was then put on display in the refectory church of Saint Sophia's Cathedral in perpetuity, and exposed for the public and tourists to view daily.

On 8 January 2019, the Tomos was brought back to Istanbul so that all the members of the Holy Synod of the Ecumenical Patriarchate could sign the Tomos. The representative of the press service of the OCU, priest Ivan Sydor, said the Tomos was valid after the signature of the Ecumenical Patriarch, "but according to the procedure, there must also be the signatures of those bishops who take part in the synod of the Constantinople Patriarchate." Former press secretary of the UOC-KP, Eustratius (Zoria) (uk), declared the Ecumenical Patriarch recognised the OCU by signing the tomos of autocephaly and by concelebrating the liturgy with Epiphanius I while considering Epiphanius as primate of the OCU. The Tomos was signed by all members of the synod of the Ecumenical Patriarchate on 9 January 2019. The tomos, signed by all members of the synod of the Ecumenical Patriarchate, was brought back to Ukraine on the morning of 10 January 2019.

The Tomos was manufactured on a parchment by the renowned painter and calligrapher of Mount Athos, hieromonk Lucas from the Xenophontos monastery.

President Poroshenko, accompanied by Metropolitan Epiphanius, visited several regions of Ukraine to present the Tomos.

The Ukrainian Minister of education said that in 2019 the tomos of autocephaly would be included in the history manuals of the 11th grade students.

Enthronement of the Primate and first meeting of the Synod 
It was planned that Epiphanius would be enthroned on 3 February 2019, which is also the date of his 40th birthday. Thereafter, the first synod of the OCU was to take place. The monasteries of Mount Athos refused to send a delegation for the enthronement ceremony "not because the Fathers do not recognise its legitimacy or canonicity, but because they have chosen to stick with what has become official practice and accept invitations only to the enthronement of their ecclesiastical head, the Ecumenical Patriarch." Two abbots of Mount Athos were planned to come at the enthronement but were to be part of the delegation of the Ecumenical Patriarchate. On 1 February, once in Kyiv, Archimandrite Ephrem, one of the two Athonite abbots, was hospitalised in consequence of a heart attack. On 2 February, Archimandrite Ephrem was visited by Metropolitan Epiphanius.

As planned, Epiphanius was enthroned in St. Sophia's Cathedral on 3 February 2019. Filaret was not present due to health conditions, so he sent his written congratulations to the primate Epiphanius, Filaret's congratulations were written by him and read at the end of the liturgy. Archimandrite Ephrem, who had been hospitalised on 1 February 2019, was not present at the ceremony of enthronement, but a hieromonk of Ephrem's monastery was present during the ceremony of enthronement. A monk from a skete of the Koutloumousiou Monastery was also present during the ceremony of enthronement.

The first meeting of the Holy Synod of the OCU was held on 5 February 2019.

Initial public statements by the Primate 
In an interview published on 13 February 2019, Epiphanius said what were the main task the OCU had to fulfill:

On 16 February 2019, the primate of the OCU, Epiphanius, said the OCU would implement reforms "normally and gradually" He gave the example of switching to the Orthodox new calendar. Before that, on 16 December 2018, he had also talked about switching to the Orthodox new calendar.

In an interview published on 1 March 2019, Epiphanius told the BBC:

In the same interview, when asked if he would allow LGBT to take communion, Epiphanius declared:

Moscow Patriarchate parishes' switchover to the Orthodox Church of Ukraine 

Following the formation of the OCU, communities (parishes) of the UOC-MP began to switch over to the jurisdiction of the OCU.

On 16 December 2018, the cathedral of Metropolitan Symeon joined the OCU. Simeon was one of the bishops of the UOC-MP who had taken part in the unification council.

On 17 December 2018, the statement of the Synodal Department of the military clergy of the Orthodox Church of Ukraine was quoted by mass media as saying that the Federal Security Service of Russia, along with members of the Moscow Patriarchate, had created mobile groups to prevent communities in Ukraine from switching from the UOC-MP to the OCU, such groups being present in each diocese of the UOC-MP and composed of a lawyer and several brawny men.

On 19 December 2018, the cathedral of Metropolitan , one of the two UOC-MP bishops who had taken part in the unification council, joined the OCU.

On 17 March 2019, TSN reported that more than 500 parishes had switched over to the OCU. Later in March, the primate of the UOC-MP contested the statistics and acknowledged 42 cases of legitimate defections only while attributing scores of others to illicit activity. On 30 March, the UOC-MP acknowledged the transfer of 61 parishes, while the OCU claimed 506 had been transferred.

In April 2022, after the Russian invasion of Ukraine, many UOC-MP parishes signaled their intention to switch allegiance.  The attitude and stance of Patriarch Kirill of Moscow to the war is one of the oft-quoted reasons.

Conflict with Filaret 
A conflict erupted between Filaret Denysenko and Epiphanius in the spring of 2019 over the model of governance, the management of the diaspora, the name, and the statute of the OCU. 
Around 20 million of Ukrainians live in a foreign country and most of them are Orthodox. U.S.A. and Canada host the more numerous communities. According to Filaret's statement in May 2019, the agreement reached at the Unification Council was as follow: "The primate is responsible for the external representation of the Ukrainian Orthodox Church (UOC), and the patriarch is responsible for the internal church life in Ukraine, but in cooperation with the primate. The primate shall do nothing in the church without the consent of the patriarch. The patriarch chairs the meetings of the Holy Synod and the UOC meetings for the sake of preserving unity, its growth, and affirmation." Filaret said that agreement had not been fulfilled.

On 20 June 2019, a group of clergy which, apart from Filaret himself, comprised only two bishops, both being from Russia, convened in St. Volodomyr Cathedral in Kyiv and adopted a document that purported to cancel the decisions of the 15 December 2018 unification council; the document stated that the UOC-KP continued to exist and had a state registration, while Filaret remained its head.

On 14 December 2019, Metropolitan Epiphanius informed the Council of Bishops, which was held in Kyiv on the occasion of the anniversary of the creation of the OCU and was not attended by Filaret, that the legal procedure of liquidation (terminarion) of the UAOC as well as the UOC-KP as legal entities had been completed the day before. Among other things, the Council of Bishops made a decision to "urge the Honorable Patriarch Filaret and his followers to seek reconciliation and end self-isolation".
Over the 15 percent of the Ukrainians would like to have the Patriarch Filaret as the Primate of the national and the Diaspora Churches, despite his age and their historical names.

Church administration

According to the OCU's Statute, the highest governing body of the Orthodox Church of Ukraine is its Local Council, which is an assembly of clergy and laity (Article 2, paragraph 1). The Local Council consists of all hierarch, ruling and others, clergy, monks, and laity from each eparchy (diocese), that were elected by eparchial assemblies. The Local Council is convened regularly by its chairman, that is Metropolitan of Kyiv, and the permanent Holy Synod at least once in five years. Also the Local Council may be convened in extraordinary way, always when its chairman wishes. The Local Council elects the Metropolitan of Kyiv out of three candidates proposed by the Hierarchal Assembly (Council of Bishops). The Local Council may approve the Statute and introduce amendments to it. It also approves amendments to the Statute submitted by the Hierarchal Assembly.

The Holy Hierarchal Assembly (Council of Bishops) consists of the Metropolitan of Kyiv and all eparchial hierarchs (Article 3, paragraph 1).

The permanent Holy Synod of the OCU is to be composed of twelve rotating members and chaired by the Metropolitan of Kyiv. For the duration of the transitional period, three permanent members of the Synod have been appointed: the former Primates of the UOC-KP (Filaret) and the UAOC (Makariy), and the former UOC-MP Metropolitan Symeon (Shostatsky).

Primates

Preceding (within Rzeczpospolita)
List of metropolitans of the "Exarchate of Ukraine":
 Job (1620–1631)
 Isaiah (1631–1633) 
 Peter III (1633–1646) who was the first metropolitan to be recognized by the Crown of Poland
 Sylvester (1647–1657)
 Dionisius II (1657–1663) who transferred the episcopal seat from Kyiv to Chyhyryn due to Muscovite military incursions 
 Joseph V, 1663–1675 
 Anton Vinnicky, (anti-Metropolitan) 1663–1679 
 vacant 1679–1685

Appointed by Romanov civil authorities (residence in Kyiv):
 Locum Tenens Lazar Baranovych,  1659–1661 
 Locum Tenens Methodius Filimonovich, 1661–1668 
 Locum Tenens Lazar Baranovych,  1670–1685 

Annexation of the Metropolitanate of Kyiv by the Moscow Patriarchate

Current (Ukraine)
 Epiphanius I of Ukraine, 2019–

Dioceses of the OCU

As of late March 2019, the following statute of diocesan administrations had been registered within the OCU's jurisdiction:

 Vinnytsia-Tulchyn diocese of the UOC (OCU), previously UOC-KP, Vinnytsia
 Vinnytsia-Bar diocese of the UOC (OCU), previously UOC-MP, Vinnytsia
 Vinnytsia-Bratslav diocese of the UOC (OCU), previously UAOC, Vinnytsia
 Volynskyi diocese of the UOC (OCU), previously UOC-KP, Lutsk
 Volodymyr-Volynski diocese of the UOC (OCU), previously UOC-KP, Volodymyr-Volynskyi
 Dnipropetrovsk diocese of the UOC (OCU), previously UOC-KP, Dnipro
 Donetsk diocese of the UOC (OCU), previously UOC-KP, Mariupol
 Donetsk-Sloviansk diocese of the UOC (OCU), previously UAOC, Sloviansk
 Zhytomyr-Ovruch diocese of the UOC (OCU), previously UOC-KP, Zhytomyr
 Zhytomyr-Polissia diocese of the UOC (OCU), previously UAOC, Zhytomyr
 Zakarpattia diocese of the UOC (OCU), previously UOC-KP, Mukachevo
 Mukachevo-Carpathian diocese of the UOC (OCU), previously UAOC, Uzhhorod
 Uzhhorod-Khust diocese of the UOC (OCU), previously UAOC, Uzhhorod
 Zaporizhzhia diocese of the UOC (OCU), previously UOC-KP, Zaporizhia
 Ivano-Frankivsk diocese of the UOC (OUC), previously UAOC, Ivano-Frankivsk
 Ivano-Frankivsk-Halych diocese of the UOC (OUC), previously UOC-KP, Ivano-Frankivsk
 Kolomyia diocese of the UOC (OCU), previously UOC-KP, Kolomyia
 Kyiv diocese of the UOC (OCU), previously UOC-KP, Kyiv (central diocese)
 Pereyaslav-Vyshneve diocese of the UOC (OCU), Kyiv
 Crimean diocese of the UOC (OCU), previously UOC-KP, Simferopol (temporarily persecuted by Russian administration)
 Kropyvnytskyi diocese of the UOC (OCU), previously UOC-KP, Kropyvnytskyi
 Luhansk diocese of the UOC (OCU), previously UOC-KP, Severdonetsk
 Lviv diocese of the UOC (OCU), previously UAOC, Lviv
 Lviv-Sokal diocese of the UOC (OCU), previously UOC-KP, Lviv
 Drohobych-Sambir diocese of the UOC (OCU), previously UOC-KP, Drohobych
 Mykolaiv diocese of the UOC (OCU), previously UOC-KP, Mykolaiv
 Odesa diocese of the UOC (OCU), previously UOC-KP, Odesa
 Poltava diocese of the UOC (OCU), previously UOC-KP, Poltava
 Rivne diocese of the UOC (OCU), previously UOC-KP, Rivne
 Rivne-Volyn diocese of the UOC (OCU), previously UAOC, Rivne
 Sumy diocese of the UOC (OCU), previously UOC-KP, Sumy
 Taurida diocese of the UOC (OCU), previously UAOC, Kherson
 Kherson diocese of the UOC (OCU), previously UOC-KP, Kherson
 Ternopil diocese of the UOC (OCU), previously UOC-KP, Ternopil
 Ternopil-Buchach diocese of the UOC (OCU), previously UAOC, Ternopil
 Ternopil-Terebovlia diocese of the UOC (OCU), previously UOC-KP, Kobylovoloky
 Kharkiv diocese of the UOC (OCU), previously UOC-KP, Kharkiv
 Kharkiv-Poltava diocese of the UOC (OCU), previously UAOC, Poltava
 Khmelnytskyi diocese of the UOC (OCU), previously UOC-KP, Khmelnytskyi
 Cherkasy diocese of the UOC (OCU), previously UOC-KP, Cherkasy
 Chernihiv diocese of the UOC (OCU), previously UOC-KP, Chernihiv
 Chernivtsi diocese of the UOC (OCU), previously UOC-KP, Chernivtsi
 Chernivtsi-Kitsman diocese of the UOC (OCU), previously UOC-KP, Chernivtsi
 Chernivtsi-Khotyn diocese of the UOC (OCU), previously UAOC, Chernivtsi

 Pereyaslav-[Bila Tserkva] diocese of the UOC (OCU), previously UOC-KP, Kyiv (merged with Kyiv diocese)
 Theotokos diocese (UOC-KP), not fully regulated
 Dnipropetrovsk-Zaporizhia diocese (UAOC), not registered
 Khmelnytskyi diocese (UAOC), not registered
 Cherkasy-Kirovohrad diocese (UAOC), not registered
 Kyiv diocese (UAOC), not registered
 Lviv-Sambir diocese (UAOC), not registered
 West European exarchate (UAOC), undetermined
 East Moldovan diocese (UOC-KP), turned to the Romanian Orthodox Church
 European exarchate (UOC-KP), abandoned
 Paris diocese (UOC-KP), abandoned
 Russian exarchate (UOC-KP), abandoned
 Bilhorod diocese (UOC-KP), abandoned
 Odesa-Black Sea diocese (UAOC), not registered before unification

According to the information presented by Metropolitan Epiphanius of Kyiv and All Ukraine in December 2019, the total number of the dioceses in the OCU stood at 44.

Reactions from domestic and international state officials

Ukraine 
During various official speeches, Poroshenko stressed the importance of Ukraine receiving its tomos of autocephaly which Ukraine "deserved", is the equivalent of "a charter of [Ukraine's] spiritual independence", was comparable to a referendum on Ukraine's independence and would be "another pillar of Ukrainian independence". On the 27th anniversary of the referendum on independence of Ukraine, Poroshenko declared the tomos of autocephaly was the equivalent of Ukraine saying Away from Moscow!' – 'Europe now!

On 15 December 2018, Poroshenko made a speech after Epiphanius' election, in which he said the autocephalous church would be "without Putin, without Kirill", but "with God and with Ukraine". He added autocephaly was "part of our state pro-European and pro-Ukrainian strategy".

On 6 January, after the OCU had received its tomos, President Poroshenko declared: "His All-Holiness Ecumenical Patriarch Bartholomew already has a special place in the history of Ukraine. With all that he did, due to his wisdom and leadership, his devotion to Ukraine and Orthodoxy, I would say that His All-Holiness will be considered a co-founder of a new Ukraine. This is a very special and historic mission".

On 7 January 2019, Ukrainian President Petro Poroshenko said that Ukraine, with the creation of the autocephalous Orthodox Church of Ukraine, has finally severed ties with Russia. He added: "The creation of the autocephalous Orthodox Church of Ukraine is the pledge of our independence. This is the foundation of our spiritual freedom. We've severed the last ties that connected us with Moscow and its fantasies about Ukraine as the canonical territory of the Russian Orthodox Church. This is not and won't be anymore." He made this declaration at the Christmas liturgy in St. Sophia Cathedral in Kyiv where the tomos of autocephaly of the Orthodox Church of Ukraine was shown to the public.

Russia 
On 12 October 2018, the press service of the president of Russia made it known that the issue of the Russian Orthodox Church (ROC) in Ukraine was the subject of deliberations at the situational meeting Russia's president had with the permanent members of the Security Council of Russia The president's spokesman Dmitry Peskov commented that the Kremlin supported the ROC's position and was ready to defend "the Orthodox faithful in Ukraine".

On 17 December 2018, it was reported that the Federal Security Service of Russia, along with members of the Moscow Patriarchate, allegedly had created mobile groups to prevent communities in Ukraine from switching from the UOC-MP to the OCU. Those groups are present in each diocese of the UOC-MP and are composed of a lawyer and several men.

On 20 December, Russia's president Vladimir Putin condemned the creation of the OCU. In an interview for Serbia's two major dailies published on 16 January 2019 on the official website of the president of Russia, Putin said the creation of the OCU and its official establishment via the Tomos was an attempt "to legalize the schismatic communities that exist[ed] in Ukraine under the jurisdiction of Istanbul, which is a gross violation of Orthodox canons".

On 6 November 2019, following the talks with his Greek counterpart Nikos Dendias, shortly after the Moscow Patriarchate severed communion with the Church of Greece in retaliation to the latter's recognition of the OCU, Russia's foreign minister Sergei Lavrov told a press conference that he believed that the OCU's recognition was predicated on the efforts of the U.S. Government and personally secretary of state Mike Pompeo.

Canada 
On 8 January 2019, Canada's Foreign Minister Chrystia Freeland congratulated the OCU for receiving its tomos of autocephaly.

United States 
On 15 December, the U.S. embassy in Kyiv congratulated, via Twitter, Ukraine for having elected the primate of the Orthodox Church of Ukraine. On 17 December, the U.S. Department of State officially congratulated Metropolitan Epiphanius on his election.

On 10 January 2019, the U.S. State Department headed by Secretary of State Mike Pompeo released a statement:

Syria 
Syrian President Bashar al-Assad was quoted by Dmitry Sablin, member of a delegation of the Russian parliament, as saying: "Attempts to divide believers are one of the most serious challenges not only for you, but also for us. Today we see attempts to divide the church on our soil as well, that is, an attempt to divide the Church of Antioch in Syria and Lebanon." Assad noted in particular that granting independence to the Lebanese Metropolitanate was being discussed and said that "the continuation of that process could follow."

Reactions from Eastern Orthodox churches

Recognition

Ecumenical Patriarchate 
On 24 December 2018, the Ecumenical Patriarchate sent a letter to the primates of the autocephalous Eastern Orthodox churches to ask them to recognise the OCU.

On Sunday 16 December 2018, the next day after the election of Epiphanius as primate of the OCU, the Ecumenical Patriarch commemorated him during a Divine Liturgy, along with the other primates of the other Orthodox churches. On 8 January 2019, the Ecumenical Patriarch sent a letter to all the hierarchs of the Ecumenical Patriarchate to ask them to commemorate Epiphanius in the diptych. On 23 January 2019, the OCU appeared on one of the official websites of the Ecumenical Patriarchate, under the category "autocephalous churches".

Patriarchate of Alexandria 
In June 2019, Patriarch Theodore II of Alexandria told Greece's newspaper Ethnos that the Ecumenical Patriarch had the right to grant autocephaly but talks between the two patriarchates involved were for reconciliation of the faithful in Ukraine.

On 12 September 2019, in the village of Ossa near Thessaloniki, a liturgy was concelebrated by the hierarchs of the Patriarchate of Constantinople, the Church of Greece (the Metropolis of Langadas) as well as Bishop Volodymyr Shlapak of the Church of Ukraine and the hierarch of the Bishop of Mozambique Chrysostom Karangunis of the Patriarchate of Alexandria. The concelebration was interpreted by the OCU as de facto recognition of the OCU on the part of the Church of Alexandria.

On 8 November 2019, the Patriarchate of Alexandria, ranked second in the diptych of the Eastern Orthodox Churches of the world, officially announced it had recognized the Orthodox Church of Ukraine, and Patriarch Theodore II commemorated the Metropolitan of Kyiv Epiphanius during the liturgy in the Archangels Cathedral in Cairo. Thereafter, the Patriarch of Alexandria sent a reply letter to Epiphanius; this move confirmed the full communion between the two churches.

Church of Greece 
On 8 January 2019, the Permanent Synod of the Church of Greece decided that the issue of recognition of the OCU would be dealt with by the Synod of the Hierarchy of the Church of Greece.

In early March 2019, the Permanent Synod discussed the Ukrainian issue and assigned it to two synodical committees for examination and appropriate recommendations. The Archbishop of Athens and All Greece Ieronymos II told the media that the Synod of the Hierarchy would discuss Ukraine at its session to be held on 19–20 March 2019. However, the issue of the OCU was not discussed.

On 10 June, Archbishop Ieronymos II of Athens attended Great Vespers with Metropolitan Epiphanius. On 14 July, Metropolitan Ignatius of Demetrias and Volos visited the Ecumenical Patriarch. He declared that Patriarch Bartholomew had the right to grant Autocephaly to Ukraine, and that the Volos Theological Academy accepts students from OCU academies.

On 28 July, at the 1,031st-anniversary celebration of the Baptism of Rus-Ukraine, Metropolitan Ioannis of Langada represented the Church of Greece and concelebrated with Metropolitan Epiphany. Earlier, Archbishop Germanos of Chernivtsi concelebrated with Greek and Constantinopolitan hierarchs in Thessaloniki.

On 28 August, Greek media sources reported that the Church of Greece supported the autocephaly of the OCU. On 28 August 2019, the Standing Holy Synod of the Church of Greece stated that the Ecumenical Patriarch had the right to grant autocephaly, and that the primate of the Church of Greece had the "privilege ... to further deal with the question of recognition of the Church of Ukraine". While the Holy Synod had not formally recognized the OCU's autocephaly, Epiphanius argued that the OCU had an honorary recognition.

On 7 October 2019, "a day before the start of the proceedings of the Synod of the Hierarchy of the Church of Greece, [the Archbishop of Athens] informed in a letter the Body of Hierarchs that he would add another extraordinary meeting this coming Saturday regarding exclusively the Ukrainian issue." This meeting was scheduled for 12 October 2019.

On 12 October 2019, the Synod of Hierarchs of the Church of Greece, with 7 bishops stating their objections, acknowledged that "the Ecumenical Patriarchate of Constantinople has the right to grant autocephalies" and empowered Archbishop Ieronymos II to act on the issue of the OCU's autocephaly accordingly. During the debate preceding the recognition, more than 35 Metropolitans of the Church of Greece said they had been pressured by the ROC but did not yield to it. Epiphanius thanked the Church of Greece as well as its primate for this decision.

According to news media reports, it had been tentatively expected that the formal act of recognition of the OCU would take place on 19 October "in Thessaloniki where Archbishop Ieronymos and Metropolitan Epiphanius w[ould] possibly concelebrate the Divine Liturgy." On 19 October, the Ecumenical Patriarch Bartholomew and Archbishop Ieronymos II of Athens jointly celebrated a liturgy in the Church of the Acheiropoietos in Thessaloniki, Greece, at which Metropolitan Epiphanius′ name was commemorated by the Patriarch. The fact was interpreted by the Greek news outlets as a definitive acknowledgement (recognition) of Epiphanius by the Church of Greece. At the end of his speech after the liturgy, Patriarch Bartholomew thanked Archbishop Ieronymos for having identified with the canonical decisions of the Ecumenical Patriarchate and having inscribed the name of Metropolitan Epiphanius of Kyiv and All Ukraine in the Diptychs. A spokesman of the Moscow Patriarchate contested the interpretation of the concelebration as recognition of the OCU by the Church of Greece pointing up the fact that Epiphanius' name was not said directly by the Archbishop.

On 21 October 2019, Archbishop Ieronymos II, the Primate of the Church of Greece, sent a peaceful letter to Metropolitan Epiphanius, the Primate of the OCU. The Archbishop's letter meant that the Church of Greece had officially communicated to the OCU that the Church of Greece had recognized it. On Sunday 10 November 2019, Archbishop Ieronymos II commemorated Epiphanius during a liturgy, thus confirming the recognition of the OCU.

On 10 December 2019, the former Minister of Defence in the Alexis Tsipras government, Panos Kammenos, admitted that he had put pressure to bear on Archbishop Ieronymos II by telling him, when in office, that Russia would withdraw what he called "guarantees" to Greece to preclude occupation by Turkey of Greek islands such as Kastellorizo, Lemnos and others in the Eastern Aegean in the event that the Church of Greece recognised the Church of Ukraine before the Patriarchates of Jerusalem and Alexandria did so. The following day, apparently in response to Kammenos′ allegations that the recognition of the UOC by the Church of Greece had resulted from pressure on the part of "some American circles", the Standing Holy Synod of the Church of Greece stated in an official communiqué that the decision to recognise the autocephaly of the Church of Ukraine proclaimed by the Ecumenical Patriarchate had been made freely and without coercion and was "entirely within the canonical and ecclesiastical tradition and ha[d] nothing to do with nationalism and other ‘from above’ interventions as ha[d] been propagated by some".

Church of Cyprus 
In his public statements made in early January 2019, the primate of the Church of Cyprus, Archbishop Chrysostomos II, stressed the importance of avoiding division in the Orthodox Church; he acknowledged that any national state was entitled to have an autocephalous church and that it was up to the Ukrainian people; he also said he would not commemorate the name of the primate of the Orthodox Church of Ukraine in the diptych. Later in January 2019, Archbishop Chrysostomos was reported to have said that he regarded the Ecumenical Patriarchate of Constantinople as the Mother church and that he enjoyed good relations with the Phanar, which he was determined to preserve any difficulties notwithstanding; he also welcomed the desire of Metropolitan Epiphanius to have concelebration and said he would one day concelebrate with Metropolitan Epiphanius in Cyprus.

On 7 February 2019, the Holy Synod of the Church of Cyprus decided that it would hold an extraordinary session on 18 February 2019 to make the definitive decision concerning the Ukrainian question. On 18 February, the Church of Cyprus announced she did not doubt the goals of granting autocephaly in Ukraine was to heal the schism in Ukraine; the Church of Cyprus also stated that if the schism in Ukraine was not overcome within a certain timeframe, the Church of Cyprus "expect[ed] that the Ecumenical Patriarch, making use of his regulatory role given to him by his position as First in Orthodoxy, w[ould] convene either a Pan-Orthodox Council or a Synaxis of the Primates to act upon the matter." In the same communiqué, the Church of Cyprus said she was offering herself as a mediator on the issue. The Church of Cyprus did not state it had recognised the OCU.

In an interview published by the Cypriot newspaper Politis in mid‐December 2019, Archbishop Chrysostomos II criticised the three bishops of his Church, namely Athanasios Nikolaou of Limassol, Nikiphoros Kykkotis of Kykkos, and Isaias Kykkotis of Tamassos, for having derogated from the decision he said had been made by the Synod of the Church of Cyprus that committed her to neutrality on the issue of Ukraine, by making public statements in support of Moscow. The Archbishop also condemned the moves undertaken by Patriarch Kirill of Moscow such as not commemorating the Ecumenical Patriarch, the Archbishop of Athens, and the Patriarch of Alexandria as well as Kirill's aspiration motivated by egoism to illegitimately achieve primacy in Orthodoxy as leading to schism.

On 7 January 2020, the Divine Liturgy in St George Patriarchal Cathedral in Istanbul presided over by the Ecumenical Patriarchate Bartholomew was concelebrated, among others, by Metropolitan Makariy Maletych (the OCU) and Metropolitan Chrysostomos Constantinos Kykkotis of Kyrenia (the Church of Cyprus).

On 24 October 2020, the primate of the Church of Cyprus, Archbishop Chrysostomos II, commemorated Epiphanius of Ukraine during the Divine Liturgy, thus recognising the OCU. Archbishop Chrysostomos, while acknowledging the fact that some members of his Church's Holy Synod had disagreed with him and had not been told about his decision to commemorate the OCU's primate, explained that he had to take a position and that his move was meant to serve above all Orthodox Christianity and the Church rather than the Church of Cyprus, or individuals. On 25 November 2020, the Holy Synod of the Church of Cyprus decided "not to oppose" the decision of the Archbishop of Cyprus to recognise the OCU.

Unrecognition

Church of Antioch 
The primate of the Greek Orthodox Church of Antioch answered to the 24 December 2018 letter of the Ecumenical Patriarch by asking the Ecumenical Patriarch to postpone the grant of autocephaly to the Orthodox Church of Ukraine.

Russian Orthodox Church (Moscow Patriarchate)
On 15 December, after the election of Epiphanius at the unification council, archpriest Nikolay Balashov, deputy head of the Moscow Patriarchate Department for External Church Relations, told Interfax that this election "means nothing" for the Russian Orthodox Church. Following the Unification Council, the Patriarch of Moscow sent letters to the Primates of all the autocephalous Orthodox Churches (but not to the Ecumenical Patriarchate nor to the OCU), urging them not to recognise the OCU insisting that those who had joined the OCU remained "schismatics". On 30 December 2018, the synod of the ROC declared the unification council of the OCU "uncanonical" and appealed to the primates and synods of the other local Orthodox churches not to recognise the OCU.

In February 2019, the Patriarchate of the Georgian Orthodox Church issued a statement that rejected what they saw as pressure and threats on the part of the ROC on the Ukrainian issue. Later in 2019, a number of bishops of the Church of Greece as well as of other autocephalous churches stated that they had been subjected to a campaign of intimidation and blackmail on the part of the Moscow Patriarchate with a view to preventing them from recognizing the Ukrainian autocephaly. This followed a Moscow-orchestrated defamation campaign personally against the Ecumenical Patriarch Bartholomew.

Having unilaterally severed Eucharistic communion with the See of Constantinople on 15 October 2018, weeks before the formal granting of autocephaly to the OCU, the Moscow Patriarchate following the subsequent recognitions of the OCU on the part of the Church of Greece (October 2019) and the Patriarchate of Alexandria (November 2019) severed eucharistic communion with the primate of the Church of Greece and announced it would stop commemorating the Patriarche of Alexandria. Severance of communion with Patriarch Theodore II of Alexandria and the like-minded bishops of his Patriarchate was confirmed by the decision of the Holy Synod of the ROC of 26 December 2019, which also decreed that the representation of the Patriarch of Moscow in Cairo be turned into a parish and the "Russian" parishes in Africa be transferred under direct jurisdiction of the Patriarch of Moscow as stauropegia. On 27 December 2019, the Divine Liturgy was celebrated by the ROC representative in the church of Demetrius of Thessaloniki in the Zeitoun district of Cairo, Egypt, for the last time, as the church was being handed back to the Patriarchate of Alexandria.

Serbian Orthodox Church 
On 13 March 2019, a document titled "The Position of the Serbian Orthodox Church on the church crisis in Ukraine" was posted on behalf of the office of the Holy Synod of the Serbian Orthodox Church reiterating the previously voiced intention not to recognise the legitimacy of the OCU's hierarchy that had been communicated in November 2018 by Bishop Irinej Bulović of Bačka, the spokesman of the SOC, in the name of the Council ("Assembly") of Bishops of the Serbian Orthodox Church. Among other things, the 13 March 2019 document, which pointedly referred to Kyiv as "the mother of all Russian cities", recommended that the Serbian clergy refrain from any communion with those who were in communion with "Mr Epiphanius Dumenko and his followers". The identical document in Russian had been published by the Moscow Patriarchate′s official web site around two weeks prior.

In May 2019, the Council of Bishops re-affirmed the Church's stance on Ukraine stating in the publication posted by Irinej Bulović: "[T]he Assembly's present position remains: our Church does not recognize the newly established false-church structure in Ukraine, led by the citizens of Denysenko and Dumenko, and is only and exclusively in liturgical and canonical communion with the canonical Ukrainian Orthodox Church, led by His Beatitude Metropolitan Onufry, and with all the other canonical Orthodox Churches".

Romanian Orthodox Church 
On 21 February 2019, the Holy Synod of the Romanian Orthodox Church discussed the Ukrainian question and declared in a communiqué:

The Romanian Orthodox Church also stated in the same communiqué: that once the schism in Ukraine has been healed, once the Ecumenical Patriarchate and the Moscow Patriarchate have settled their dispute over Ukraine, once the Romanian Orthodox Church has "written assurances from Ukrainian ecclesiastical and state authorities that the ethnic and linguistic identity of [the 127 Romanian Orthodox parishes in Ukraine currently administered by the UOC-MP] will be respected, and that these Romanian Orthodox will have the possibility to organise themselves within a Romanian Orthodox Vicariate and to be able to cultivate spiritual relations with the Romanian Patriarchate", and once the Ecumenical Patriarchate has clarified "the problem of the non-canonical hierarchs and priests in the West, who belonged to the former "Kyiv Patriarchate", then "the Holy Synod will express its official position on the situation of Orthodoxy in Ukraine."

In March 2019, Epiphanius declared that he was in favor of creating a Romanian vicariate and that they "will discuss everything".

Polish Orthodox Church 
On 2 April 2019, the assembly of bishops of the Polish Orthodox Church released a communiqué. In it, it reiterated its stance taken 9 May and 15 November 2018. The communiqué says the POC is in favor of granting autocephaly to Ukraine, and that autocephaly should be given "according to the dogmatic and canonical norms of the whole Church, and not of a group of schismatics. Those who left the Church and have been deprived of their priestly ordination, cannot represent a healthy ecclesial body. It is an uncanonical act, violating the Eucharistic and inter-Orthodox unity." The decision of the Assembly on the OCU was reaffirmed on 26 October 2021.

Reactions from religious bodies outside of Eastern Orthodoxy

Catholic Church 
The head of the Conference of Roman Catholic Bishops of Ukraine congratulated Epiphanius on his election in the name of the Roman Catholic bishops of Ukraine.

Major Archbishop Shevchuk of the Ukrainian Greek Catholic Church (UGCC) congratulated the Orthodox Ukrainians on the formation of the OCU and said it was a "historic moment for Christians in Ukraine". On 18 December 2018, Shevchuck sent a letter of congratulation, in the name of both the UGCC and in his own name, to Metropolitan Epiphanius and said the election of Epiphanius was "God's gift on the way to the complete unity of the churches of Volodymyr's Baptism".

However, in an interview published at the end of December 2019 on Radio Liberty, Major Archbishop Shevchuk said there was "no process of unification of the UGCC with the OCU".

Protestantism 
Concerning the formation of the OCU, the Seventh-day Adventist Church "takes a positive stance towards all the movements and activities that have served the unification of people, the search for ways of peaceful coexistence and understanding".

Judaism 
Rabbi Oleksandr, head of the Religious Association of Progressive Judaism Communities of Ukraine, congratulated Orthodox Ukrainians for the receiving of the tomos of autocephaly.

Islam 
Said Ismagilov, Mufti of the Religious Administration of Muslims of Ukraine sent a congratulatory message to Epiphanius after the latter's election. On 6 January 2019, Said congratulated the Eastern Orthodox Christians for the receiving of the tomos by Ukraine.

Reforms 
The Orthodox Church of Ukraine plans to introduce a number of new rules in churches. In particular, innovations currently being discussed by bishops include permission for women to enter the church with their heads uncovered, the installation of benches for seating in churches, and permission for the burial of Catholics.

Certain innovations are also introduced in church music. For example, during the celebration of Easter 2019 in St. Michael's Golden-Domed Cathedral, a bell rang, written and performed by students of the Kyiv Orthodox Theological Academy.

On 20 May 2019, Metropolitan of Cherkasy and Chyhyryn OCU Ioan (Yaremenko) announced that membership in the Orthodox Church of Ukraine is being introduced "on an applicant basis". Each parish will have an open register of its members who are actively involved in the religious, educational, financial, economic and charitable activities of the community.

Calendar 

Commenting on possible changes in the church calendar, Metropolitan Epiphanius during 2019–2020 repeatedly stressed that they should take place gradually, as a result of educational work and corresponding changes in society's views. Reacting to the decision of Metropolitan Mykhailo of Lutsk and Volyn (some other bishops took the same initiative) to celebrate Christmas twice, on 25 December and 7 January, the Holy Synod of the OCU decided on 4 February 2020, that:

However, the Synod of the OCU allowed to perform on 25 December with the blessing of the ruling bishop prayers with the akathist at Christmas and carols.

In December 2021, the primate of the Orthodox Church of Ukraine, Metropolitan Epiphanius, expressed hope in an interview with Radio Svoboda that for the next 10 years, most Ukrainians could switch to celebrating Christmas on 25 December:

On October 18, 2022, the Orthodox Church of Ukraine allowed dioceses to hold Christmas services according to the Revised Julian calendar, i.e., December 25. Where there are pastoral circumstances for this and the desire of the faithful is evidenced, as an exception, by decision of the abbot and the congregation, on December 25, 2022, it may be allowed to hold a divine service with subsequent submission through the diocesan administration to the Kyiv Metropolitanate of written information about the number of participants in divine services. In the case of a divine service, its participants are released from the restrictions of fasting on this day.

On December 24, 2022, during an audience, Major archbishop Sviatoslav handed over to Metropolitan Epiphanius for review a letter outlining the considerations of the UGCC hierarchs regarding the calendar reform. The primates decided to create a joint working group on specific proposals for calendar reform. The joint group is initiated on the occasion of the celebration of the 1700th anniversary of the First Ecumenical Council, held in Nicaea in 325. In this Council, in particular, the calendar principles of church life were determined. On December 25, 2022, Metropolitan Epiphanius announced that at the next meeting of the Synod of the OCU, he would study the experience gained in celebrating Christmas Liturgies on December 25, 2022 in the new style, both positive and negative. And in the future, further steps in the calendar reform of the OCU will be determined exclusively by the council.

On January 6, 2023, Metropolitan Epiphanius announced that the parishes of the Orthodox Church of Ukraine, which want to completely switch to the Revised Julian calendar, will soon be able to do so after the decision of the nearest meeting of the Synod, noting that the OCU has already started on the path of reforming the church calendar and will do everything in order to implement it during 2023.

On February 2, 2023, the Holy Synod of the OCU allowed and approved the procedure for blessing parishes and monasteries for the full use of the Revised Julian calendar, and on May 24, 2023, to hold a meeting of the Council of Bishops, where the issue of calendar reform will be raised.

Liturgical practices 
The clergy of the Ukrainian Orthodox Church are involved in the work of the Ukrainian Liturgical Society, which is working to improve Ukrainian-language translations of liturgical texts, and to develop prayer, liturgical, and theological terminology. According to V. Khromets, one of the currently unresolved problems is the inconsistency of the current translations with the original sources (in particular, Greek). The Orthodox liturgical tradition and liturgical literature in Ukraine were also influenced by the long stay under the jurisdiction of the Moscow Patriarchate.

One of the steps towards the return of ancient liturgical traditions was the decision of the Synod of the OCU, according to which it is necessary to pronounce the litany for those announced in the parishes where they are announced – those who are preparing to receive Baptism and undergo catechesis. missing. The traditional following of the epiclesis, ie "the invocation of the grace of the Holy Spirit on the offered Gifts", was restored, according to the practice that existed in the Orthodox Church of Ukraine until the 16th century.

10 theses 
On the eve of the enthronement of Metropolitan Epiphanius, an initiative group of priests and laity of the OCU published a document with ten proposals for the agenda for the newly established autocephalous Church, which would help it better carry out its vocation in today's circumstances. Among them are calls for true catholicity, renewal of parish life, greater involvement of believers in the Church, quality translation of liturgical texts, "new evangelization", abandonment of the old paradigm of church-state relations, strengthening transparency and accountability, Church social service, church reform education, dialogue and openness.

Transition of church communities from Moscow Patriarchate to OCU 

From 15 December 2018 to 7 November 2022, 1153 religious communities and monasteries have announced their transition from the UOC of the Moscow Patriarchate to the Orthodox Church of Ukraine.

See also
Autocephaly to the Orthodox Church of Ukraine
Unification council of the Orthodox churches of Ukraine
Conflict between Filaret and Epiphanius

Notes

References

Further reading 
 Denysenko, Nicholas, The Orthodox Church in Ukraine: A Century of Separation, Northern Illinois University Press, 2018
 History of the Ukrainian church at the Encyclopedia of Ukraine

External links 

Text of the tomos of autocephaly of the Orthodox church of Ukraine in Ukrainian, Greek and English (in Ukrainian on RISU.org) (in Greek in the archives of the Ecumenical Patriarchate)

 
Ukrainian Orthodox church bodies
Ukraine
2018 establishments in Ukraine
Christian organizations established in 2018
Russia–Ukraine relations
Greece–Russia relations